The 1929 Primera División was the 14th season of top-flight Peruvian football. A total of 13 teams competed in this league, with Federación Universitaria winning its first league title. Alianza Lima was disqualified after 7 games; their record was deleted but they were admitted for 1930.

Changes from 1928

Structural changes 
The 1928 season was reduced from 19 to 13 teams and was played in a single league table instead of two. Thus, the championship group stage was removed. Two teams were relegated instead of eight.

Promotion and Relegation 
Santa Catalina, Lawn Tennis, Asociación Alianza, Alberto Secada, Jorge Washington, Alianza Callao, José Alaya and Unión were relegated by placing last in their respective groups. Sporting Tabaco and Hidroaviación were promoted in their place.

Results

Standings

External links 
 Peru 1929 season at RSSSF
 Peruvian Football League News 

1928 in Peru
1928
Peru
1929 in Peruvian football